This is a list of cathedrals in Scotland.

A cathedral church is a Christian place of worship that is the chief, or 'mother' church of a diocese. The distinction of cathedral refers to that church being the location of the cathedra, the seat of the bishop. In the strictest sense, only Christian denominations with an episcopal hierarchy — those that are led by bishops — possess cathedrals. However, in common parlance, the title cathedral is often still used to refer to former Scottish cathedrals, which are now within the (presbyterian) Church of Scotland.

Because of Scotland's religious history, cathedrals of several different Christian denominations are found around the country. Before the Scottish Reformation, the Christian church in Scotland was Catholic. Its thirteen dioceses were each governed by a bishop whose Episcopal see was centred on a cathedral. In 1560, the Scottish church broke communion with Rome and became Protestant. After years of dispute, the post-Reformation Church of Scotland finally abolished the Episcopacy in 1689 and adopted the Presbyterian system of governance. Scotland's former cathedrals remained in use as parish churches, now organised under a system of synods and presbyteries.

The Scottish Episcopal Church formed as a breakaway from the Established Church of Scotland, retaining the system of bishops, was Anglican, but it was excluded from mainstream religious life.  In the later 19th century, laws repressing Episcopalian and Catholic worship were repealed (for example, under the Roman Catholic relief bills). With their newfound freedom, these denominations flourished and began to build their own cathedrals. For this reason, Scotland's Episcopalian and Catholic cathedrals are mostly Victorian in origin.

Church of Scotland
The Church of Scotland is no longer governed by bishops, and so officially has no cathedrals. However, buildings that were cathedrals prior to the Reformation, or in periods of the church's history when it did have an episcopacy, are still commonly called "cathedrals". They are often denoted by the title "High Kirk".

Scottish Episcopal Church

Catholic Church

Province of St Andrews and Edinburgh

Province of Glasgow

Greek Orthodox Church, also serving other Orthodox communities

See also
 Church architecture in Scotland
 List of former cathedrals in Great Britain 
 List of cathedrals
 Religion in Scotland

References

External links

Scotland